The Central Pennsylvania Christian Institute (CPCI) is a non-denominational, non-profit Christian organization that oversees the ministries of Way Truth Life Radio, Camp Kanesatake, Puppets With a Purpose, and the Ezekiel Forum.  CPCI was established in 1977 to serve the central Pennsylvania area through ministries that edify and encourage the body of Christ.

Ministries

Way Truth Life Radio 
Way Truth Life Radio is a non-commercial, listener-supported radio broadcasting from two stations in central Pennsylvania. WTLR, 89.9 FM has served Pennsylvania's heartland since 1978. WQJU, 107.1 FM, Mifflintown, became CPCI's second full-power radio station in January 1993. Serving listeners in an area to the south and east of WTLR's broadcast range, WQJU operates as a satellite of WTLR, bringing identical programming to Mifflin, Snyder, Juniata, and Perry counties.

Camp Kanesatake 
Camp Kanesatake became a part of the ministries of CPCI in 1989 when the board of directors was made aware of the availability of the camp and the need for Christian camping in the central Pennsylvania area. Constructed in 1923 by the Pennsylvania Sabbath School Association. CPCI's purchase of the camp ensured the continuation of this heritage into the 21st century.

Puppets With a Purpose 
Puppets With a Purpose (PWAP) is a Christian-based youth ministry whose purpose is to share the Gospel of Jesus Christ with fellow Christians and non-Christians alike through the use of puppets.  From its inception in 1993 to today, PWAP continuously produces short stories mixed with music told by a team of 10-15 puppeteers and assistants.

Outreach is a major goal of PWAP.  In addition to local performances at churches and youth events, the PWAP team began to take mission trips to foreign countries for the purpose of creating new puppet ministry teams in those locations. In 2005 the team traveled to Peru to form a group of Christian puppeteers to minister to the local population.

Ezekiel Forum 
The speaker series sponsored by CPCI is known as the Ezekiel Forum.  Recent events have included Dr. Peter Jones speaking on the book Da Vinci Code, sponsorship of internationally known theologian and apologist Ravi Zacharias, and financial teaching from the Biblical Stewardship Series.

Governance 
CPCI is governed by an uncompensated board of directors made up of Christian laymen from various area churches.  The board reflects CPCI's commitment to non-denominational ministry.  Although they come from different churches and theological persuasions, the directors lay these differences aside in order to work together in a cooperative effort to exalt their Lord.

Registrations and memberships 
CPCI is registered as a not-for-profit corporation by the Commonwealth of Pennsylvania and recognized by the Internal Revenue Service as a 501(c)(3) organization.  It is a member of the Christian Stewardship Association.

Christianity in Pennsylvania